= Ilaria Dallatana =

Italian business executive

Ilaria Dallatana (born May 17, 1966 in Parma) is an Italian business executive and entrepreneur. She was Director of Rai 2 from February 18, 2016 to October 12, 2017.

== Biography ==
She attended Catholic University of Milan and studied Modern Literature, she immediately began her career in communications. She later moved to Madrid and engaged in the reorganization of Telecinco, she returned to Italy working at the Mediaset networks as head of production. On February 18, 2016 she was appointed Director of Rai 2.

In October 2017, she left the post in Rai for personal reasons.
